CQB may refer to:
 Close-quarters combat, a close combat situation between multiple combatants involving ranged weapons
 Chandler Regional Airport, the FAA LID code CQB
 Chicom CQB, a suppressed bullpup submachine gun
 AA-12 CQB, a variant of an automatic combat shotgun Atchisson AA-12
 SWAT 3: Close Quarters Battle or SWAT3:CQB, a tactical shooter video game
 CQB (The Expanse), an episode of the American science fiction television series The Expanse